Ken or Kenneth Duncan may refer to:

 Ken Duncan (photographer) (born 1954), Australian photographer
 Ken Duncan (politician) (born 1945), Louisiana state treasurer
 Ken Duncan (American football) (born 1946), punter in the National Football League
 Kenne Duncan (1903–1972), Canadian-born B-movie character actor
 Kenneth Forrest Duncan (1881–1952), public servant and political figure in British Columbia
 Kenneth Charles Duncan, Australian architect
 Sandy Duncan (athlete) (1912–2005), English sprinter